Juan Maraude (born 11 January 1981) is a retired Argentine football striker. He twice became top goalscorer on Bolivia's first tier, in 2007 Clausura and 2011 Torneo.

References

1981 births
Living people
People from Tarija
Argentine footballers
Municipal Real Mamoré players
Oriente Petrolero players
Alianza Atlético footballers
Club San José players
Club Atlético Ciclón players
Guabirá players
Bolivian Primera División players
Association football forwards
Argentine expatriate footballers
Expatriate footballers in Bolivia
Argentine expatriate sportspeople in Bolivia
Expatriate footballers in Peru
Argentine expatriate sportspeople in Peru